Jānis Lūsis (19 May 1939 – 29 April 2020) was a Latvian track and field athlete who competed in javelin throw.

Biography 

Lūsis trained at Daugava Voluntary Sports Society and later at Armed Forces sports society. He competed in four Summer Olympics for the USSR team, winning bronze in 1964 Olympics, gold in 1968 Olympics and silver in 1972 Olympics.

The javelin competition at the 1972 Games was the closest in Olympic history. Germany's Klaus Wolfermann had taken the lead from Lūsis in the fifth round with an Olympic Record throw of 90.48 meters. Then, in the sixth and final round, Lūsis let fly with a very long effort that measured at 90.46 meters - Wolfermann's two-centimeter margin was, at the time, the smallest unit of measurement used in javelin competitions.

, he remains the only Latvian to have won an all three classes of Olympic medals (gold, silver and bronze) over the span of his career. Lūsis set two world records in javelin throw, of 91.68 m in 1968 and of 93.80 m in 1972. He is also a 4-time European champion. In 1987 IAAF named him the greatest javelin thrower in history.

After Lūsis finished competing, he became an athletics coach. He was married to Elvīra Ozoliņa, the 1960 Olympic female champion in the javelin throw. Their son, Voldemārs Lūsis, is also a javelin thrower who competed in 2000 Summer Olympics and 2004 Summer Olympics.

During the 2009 Latvian Sportspersonality of the year award ceremony, Lūsis received the Lifetime Contribution to Sport award.

In 2014 he was inducted into IAAF Hall of Fame.

References

External links

Latvian Bio

1939 births
2020 deaths
Sportspeople from Jelgava
Soviet male javelin throwers
Latvian male javelin throwers
Latvian sports coaches
Soviet athletics coaches
Olympic male javelin throwers
Olympic athletes of the Soviet Union
Olympic gold medalists for the Soviet Union
Olympic silver medalists for the Soviet Union
Olympic bronze medalists for the Soviet Union
Olympic gold medalists in athletics (track and field)
Olympic silver medalists in athletics (track and field)
Olympic bronze medalists in athletics (track and field)
Athletes (track and field) at the 1964 Summer Olympics
Athletes (track and field) at the 1968 Summer Olympics
Athletes (track and field) at the 1972 Summer Olympics
Athletes (track and field) at the 1976 Summer Olympics
Medalists at the 1964 Summer Olympics
Medalists at the 1968 Summer Olympics
Medalists at the 1972 Summer Olympics
Universiade medalists in athletics (track and field)
Universiade gold medalists for the Soviet Union
Medalists at the 1963 Summer Universiade
European Athletics Championships medalists
Japan Championships in Athletics winners
Armed Forces sports society athletes